Jahangir Tareen PTI group or simply Jahangir Tareen group is a political group formed in May 2019 by Jahangir Tareen to raise voice against the 'reprisals' carried out by the Punjab Government. Jahangir Tareen group has more than 30 members and has appointed Raja Riaz in the National Assembly and Saeed Akbar Khan in the Punjab Assembly Parliamentary Leader.

References

2019 establishments in Pakistan
Political parties established in 2019
Political party alliances in Pakistan